Guglielmo Mancori (5 November 1927 – 13 February 1995) was an Italian cinematographer, lighting director and camera operator.

He worked in Manhattan Baby (1982), Carabinieri si nasce (1985), by Mariano Laurenti, and Nella stretta morsa del ragno (1971). He also worked in Adventurer of Tortuga (1965), Revenge of The Gladiators (1964), Revenge of the Mercenaries (1962), Nebraska il Pistolero (1966), L' Occhio del male (1982), Così dolce... così perversa (1969), Da Corleone a Brooklyn (1978), Spasmo (1974),

Filmography

References

Bibliography

External links
 

1927 births
1995 deaths
Italian cinematographers
Lighting designers